Sydney Park is a recreational area in Sydney, New South Wales, Australia.

Sydney Park may also refer to:
 Sydney Olympic Park, a suburb of Greater Western Sydney
 Sydney Park (actress), American actress